Louky van Olphen-van Amstel (born 14 April 1934) is a Dutch equestrian. She competed in the individual dressage event at the 1976 Summer Olympics.

References

1934 births
Living people
Dutch female equestrians
Dutch dressage riders
Olympic equestrians of the Netherlands
Equestrians at the 1976 Summer Olympics
Sportspeople from Haarlem
20th-century Dutch women